"Juanita" is the title of a 1997 promotional single release and a song by Underworld, and the first portion of the opening combined track "Juanita/Kiteless/To Dream of Love," from their 1996 album Second Toughest in the Infants.

The band also released different mixes of the track, including a live version on the 2000 live album Everything, Everything, and as "Juanita 2022," on a May 2022 EP.

Background 
The album version of the track is titled "Juanita/Kiteless/To Dream of Love," as "Juanita" forms only the first part of three in the track, with "Kiteless" and "To Dream of Love" pushing it to its length of over sixteen minutes. The "Promo Short Cut" version included on the promotional single cuts down the six-minutes "Juanita" part, and edits and fades it out to 3:49.

The song was the regular set-opener of their Second Toughest in the Infants and Beaucoup Fish tours. It is named after Juanita Boxill, who later contributed spoken word vocals for their album A Hundred Days Off. The 2000 live album Everything, Everything, which documents the Beaucoup Fish tour, features a version which includes "Juanita" and "Kiteless" only, and runs to 12:35.

Reviews 
In a 2016 rundown of the band's best tracks on Stereogum, music critic Sean T Collins rated "Juanita" as "the single strongest argument for [Underworld's] genius," and noted: "The peculiar sample which occurs at the end of the track is one of Karl Hyde’s most effective deployments of his observational writing. His technique consisted of simply sitting and while he recorded himself listing the colours of passing cars, played it back at high speed, slowing down the occasional entry in the list as if it contained some special, unknowable meaning."

Juanita 2022 
In May 2022, the band released a new remix of the song entitled "Juanita 2022," on an EP alongside the live version of "Juanita/Kiteless" from the 2000 live album Everything, Everything.

Track listing

Promo single

Juanita 2022 EP

References

Underworld (band) songs
1997 singles
1995 songs
Wax Trax! Records singles
Songs written by Darren Emerson
Songs written by Rick Smith (musician)
Songs written by Karl Hyde